John Adams Ten Eyck III (October 28, 1893 - October 21, 1932) was a painter and etcher.

Biography
He was born on October 28, 1893, in Bridgeport, Connecticut. He was the son of Dr. John Adams Ten Eyck II (?-1906) and Bella Burnham. He attended the New York School of Fine and Applied Arts. In 1918 he married and then served in World War I. He died in Shippan Point in Stamford, Connecticut. His granddaughter was Beverley Sener who married Aubin Lueckner.

References

20th-century American painters
1893 births
1932 deaths
American male painters
American military personnel of World War I
American people of Dutch descent
Artists from Connecticut
Artists from Stamford, Connecticut
Parsons School of Design alumni
John Adams III
Year of birth unknown